Christopher Magee may refer to:

 Christopher Magee (politician) (1848–1901), political boss in Pittsburgh, Pennsylvania, United States
 Christopher Magee (fighter pilot) (1917–1995), United States Marine Corps aviator
 Christopher L. Magee (born 1940), American mechanical engineer, academic and researcher